Giacomo Coltrini (16th century) was an Italian painter, active mainly in a Renaissance style in Brescia, and a military engineer for Venetian Republic. He painted frescoes for the subterranean church of San Faustino Maggiore in Brescia. He died as a military engineer in Candia. Titian's paternal uncle, Gregorio Vecelli, lived in Coltrini's house in Venice.

References

Sources

Painters from Brescia
16th-century Italian painters
Italian male painters
Italian Renaissance painters
Italian military engineers
Engineers from Brescia